Olanrewaju is a name of Yoruba origin meaning:"Wealth is the future."

People with the names include:
Lanre Oyebanjo (born 1990), footballer
Olanrewaju Durodola (born 1977), Nigerian boxer

References

Yoruba given names